The Office of the National Economic and Social Development Council, also known as NESDC, is a national economic planning agency of Thailand. It is a government department reporting directly to the Office of the Prime Minister. The NESDC maintains four regional offices in Chiang Mai, Khon Kaen, Songkhla, and Nonthaburi. Sanit Aksornkoae, Chairman of the NESDC, stated that in 2018 the Office of the National Economic and Social Development Board (NESDB) underwent a major revamp, including being officially renamed the NESDC. The NESDC's Secretary-General is Thosaporn Sirisamphand, appointed 4 July 2018. Its FY2019 budget is 609.7 million baht.

Background
 Established on 15 February 1950 as the National Economic Council (NEC)
 Renamed the Office of the National Economic Development Board (NEDB) in 1959.
 Launched the first National Economic Development Plan in 1961
 Reformed as the National Economic and Social Development Board (NESDB) in 1972, under the Prime Minister's Office
 Reformed as the National Economic and Social Development Council (NESDC) in 2018, under the Prime Minister's Office

Mission
NESDC is Thailand's central planning agency responsible for crafting strategies for balanced and sustainable development in the national interest.

Key functions
 Formulate the  five-year National Economic and Social Development Plan. The current plan is The Twelfth National Economic and Social Development Plan, 2017–2021. The aims of the Twelfth Plan are consistent with the targets of the 20-year national strategy (2017–2036).
 Pursue four national agendas:
 Alleviate poverty and income distribution imbalances
 Enhance Thailand's competitiveness
 Promote social capital development
 Promote sustainable development
 Formulate strategies for key government policies and major development projects
 Analyze budget proposals by state-owned enterprises and related agencies
 Create an economic intelligence database, especially for GDP data
 Develop development indicators

Organizational structure
The NESDC is composed of two main components:

NESDC board
 Composed of 23 members
 Provides recommendations and comments on national economic and social development to the prime minister and cabinet
 Coordinates NESDC efforts and those of related government agencies and state enterprises to formulate plans, development projects, and implementation plans.

Office of the NESDC
 Divided into 13 offices and two divisions
 Headed by the chairman and secretary-general
 Accommodates key development variables, notably the move towards a knowledge-based economy, civil service reforms, and good governance

See also
 Office of the Prime Minister (Thailand)
 Prime Minister of Thailand

References

Government departments of Thailand
Government agencies established in 1950
1950 establishments in Thailand
Office of the Prime Minister (Thailand)